The  2018 Pskov Oblast gubernatorial election was held on 9 September 2018, on common election day. To be elected, a candidate must get more than 50% of votes.  Governor Mikhail Vedernikov secured a new term after winning 70.68 percent of the vote. If no one had achieved 50%, a runoff would've been held 14 days later. Only the two most successful candidates from the first round participate in the second round. The Governor will be elected for five years.

Background
The previous Governor of Pskov Oblast Andrey Turchak resigned ahead of schedule on 12 October 2017, to take up the post of the General Secretary of United Russia. On the same day, Mikhail Vedernikov was appointed as acting Governor until the election.

Candidates

Individuals who have publicly expressed interest

Yabloko
Lev Schlosberg, member of the Pskov Oblast Council of Deputies.

Result

References

Pskov Oblast
Politics of Pskov Oblast